Eve Cigarettes is an American brand of cigarettes, currently owned and manufactured by the Liggett Group in the United States. Outside of the U.S, Philip Morris International is the manufacturer of the brand.

History
Eve was launched in 1971 as competition for rival Philip Morris corporation's Virginia Slims as a cigarette targeted at the growing women's market. Virginia Slims, a brand marketed specifically to women, were aimed at women who identified themselves as liberated, independent, and modern; Eves were aimed at women content to be feminine.

In the 20th century, both the Eve cigarettes and the packages containing them featured a floral design, prompting some ads to describe the cigarette as having "Flowers on the outside, flavor on the inside." As of 2002, the floral pattern has been replaced by butterflies, an updated graphic that appears less old-fashioned and more appealing to younger audiences.

Advertising for Eve urged women to embrace their femininity. Like Virginia Slims, Eve hoped to attract women by harnessing the power of fashion. Many print advertisements across the decades portrayed women in fashionable, ladylike outfits, notably more conservative than their Virginia Slims counterparts. Some Eve slogans made direct reference to physical appearance, such as the "Farewell to the ugly cigarette pack" and "Eves of the world, you are beautiful" in the 1970s. Both slogans told women that they would be beautiful if they smoked a beautiful cigarette. Like Virginia Slims, Eve cigarettes are longer and narrower than average cigarettes, a clear reference to a woman’s figure. A slim, slender figure is often presented as more desirable in women’s fashion magazines and by models in the fashion industry. Thus, Eve joined Virginia Slims in providing a subliminal, indirect message that their brand would result in its smokers obtaining or maintaining a slim figure. Eve also took advantage of its extra length (commonly 120mm as opposed to the 85 mm of an average cigarette); a 1980s slogan, "Every inch a lady", drove home the connection between long cigarettes and sophisticated, ladylike women.

Marketing

Eve cigarettes used feminine art in their marketing, starting with the cigarette itself, which was long and slim. The length was originally 100mm, but increased to 120mm within two years to be more readily identified with the feminine ideals of slimness and length. The packages were decorated with flowers to look feminine and fashionable, specifically signifying that this was a lady's cigarette, as well as to catch the eye of consumers.

The advertising approach was to make Eve appear to be a beautiful cigarette, which made the woman who chose to smoke Eve more attractive. Accordingly, the objective was to capture the market share from other brands, particularly other brands targeted at women, and to recruit non-smokers, suggesting that an Eve smoker is more attractive than a woman who did not smoke.

The marketing approach was designed to be very feminine. Models were very elegant, ladylike, and elaborately made up. Advertising text complemented the feminine imagery. In 1976, Eve was even marketed in association with a fashion line with colors and floral prints similar to Eve cigarette packs. The message was that women who smoked Eve were feminine, ladylike, and ladies of leisure. Slogans used included "Finally a cigarette as pretty as you" and "Every inch the lady".

For almost 40 years, Eve cigarettes have been aimed at the same niche market, women and young girls who wish to appear ladylike. They have not sold as well as the competing Virginia Slims cigarettes, which have always had broader appeal.

Markets
Eve is mainly sold in the United States, but also was or still is sold in Germany, Philippines, Austria, Ceuta, Melilla, Italy, Hungary, Russia, Israel and Argentina.

Packaging

The packaging has evolved to keep up with the times. Packaging went from a soft pack with the trademark flowers and drawing of Eve in the garden (gen. 1) to losing the female figure and retaining only the flowers (gen. 2) then moving the flowers to a band lengthwise on a white cardboard box (gen. 3). This packaging went unchanged until 1992 when the small multicolored flowers were replaced by thin orchid-like flowers in jewel tones on the box, and a single small colored flower on the filter band of the cigarette (gen. 4). In Germany the packaging and cigarette design did not change, retaining the floral band. Menthol versions of Eve used similar designs but with more green tones. Shorter 100mm Eve in Regular and Menthol boxes were reintroduced in 1985 but gradually disappeared due to lack of interest. In 1990 Eve Ultra Lights 120s were introduced in Regular and Menthol, promising lowered tar and nicotine, and milder flavor. Packaging was white flip top box with long stemmed flowers done in pale pastels, with a single pale pastel flower on the filter band. Menthols were similar but with more green. After 1992 packaging remained unchanged until 2002, except for yet another unsuccessful reintroduction of 100mm length Eve Lights and Eve Ultra Lights in 1991. In 2002 the flowers were replaced by butterflies (gen. 5). Ultra Lights lost the long stemmed flowers they had since their introduction and unified with the regulars for the first time by assuming the butterfly motif, with different colors identifying Ultra Lights (blue) and Menthol Ultra Lights (teal), to complement the colors identifying Lights (purple) and Menthol |Lights (green). In 2002 soft pack 100s were reintroduced yet again, using the butterfly design of the 120s. And as before, 100s gradually disappeared.

, four styles of Eve cigarettes were available: Eve Lights 120s, Eve Ultra Lights 120s, Eve Menthol Lights 120s, and Eve Menthol Ultra Lights 120s. The butterfly band around the filter and above the rings with the Eve logo was done in a subtle watermark, instead of bright colors as had been done in the past. By July 2010, in keeping with the Family Smoking Prevention and Tobacco Control Act, the words "lights" and "ultralights" had been removed. Eve Lights 120s were renamed Eve Amethyst 120s, Eve Ultralights 120s were renamed Eve Sapphire 120s, Eve Menthol Lights 120s were renamed Eve Menthol Emerald 120s, and Eve Menthol Ultralights 120s were renamed Eve Menthol Turquoise 120s.

See also
Fashion brands
Smoking culture
Tobacco smoking

References

Products introduced in 1971
Liggett Group brands